The Ice Breaker Tournament (also called the Ice Breaker Invitational or the Ice Breaker Cup) is a college Division I men's ice hockey tournament played annually at the start of each season.

The tournament began play in 1997 as an exhibition and was created as an early-season showcase for top-ranked teams from four separate conferences. After the first year the games became an official part of the NCAA season and counted towards the standings. The participants are selected partially based upon their pre-season rankings with one of the four usually serving as the host. Twice, in 2010 and 2012, local sports commissions served as hosts when there was no local university available. Only Minnesota has played in consecutive Ice Breaker Tournaments (2013, 2014). The tournament is typically held during the opening weekend of college hockey season.

Due to the 2020 edition being cancelled because of the COVID-19 pandemic, the tournament was held twice in 2021 in successive weeks. The first tournament (East) had a predetermined schedule rather than utilizing an elimination format; the winner and placement was determined by highest record in the two games. The second tournament (West) returned to the normal championship/consolation format.

The 2022 edition was co-hosted by Air Force and Denver, necessitating a predetermined schedule rather than an elimination format. The 2023 edition is scheduled to be co-hosted by Bemidji State and North Dakota.

Yearly results

† Michigan and North Dakota declined to participate in a shootout to determine a winner

Team records

References

College ice hockey tournaments in the United States
Recurring events established in 1997